The 2008 Volta a Lleida (56th edition) road cycling race took place from June 2 to June 7, 2008 in Lleida, Catalonia, Spain. Lars Boom took the overall victory, becoming the second rider from the Netherlands to win the general classification.

Stages

Stage 1 - June 2, 2008: Lleida > Alcarràs, 116.4 km

Stage 2 - June 3, 2008: Alcarràs > Tremp, 114.3 km

Stage 3 - June 4, 2008: Tremp > La Seu d'Urgell, 125.1 km

Stage 4 - June 5, 2008: La Seu d'Urgell > Les, 147.3 km

Stage 5 - June 6, 2008: Les > Vielha, 20.0km (TTT)

Stage 5 (second area) - June 6, 2008: Les > El Pont de Suert, 60.0 km

Stage 6 - June 7, 2008: El Pont de Suert > Lleida, 140.7 km

Teams and cyclists 
The following teams were named to the 2008 Volta a Catalunya:

External links
  

Volta a Lleida
Lleida
Lleida